Tirupalli Mukkudal Tirunethranathar Temple
() is a Hindu temple located at Tirupalli Mukkudal in Tiruvarur district, Tamil Nadu, India. The historical name of the place is Kekkarai. The temple is dedicated to Shiva, as the moolavar presiding deity, in his manifestation as Tirunethranathar. His consort, Parvati, is known as Mayilmevum Kanni.

Significance 

It is one of the shrines of the 275 Paadal Petra Sthalams - Shiva Sthalams glorified in the early medieval Tevaram poems by Tamil Saivite Nayanar Tirunavukkarasar.

Literary mention 
Tirunavukkarasar describes the feature of the deity as:

References

External links 
 
 

Shiva temples in Tiruvarur district
Padal Petra Stalam